Ji-ho, also spelled Chi-ho or Jie-ho, is a Korean unisex given name, predominantly masculine. Its meaning differs based on the hanja used to write each syllable of the name. There are 36 hanja with the reading "ji" and 49 hanja with the reading "ho" on the South Korean government's official list of hanja which may be registered for use in given names. Ji-ho was the eighth-most popular name for newborn boys in South Korea in 2015, with 2,095 being given the name.

People with this name include:

Entertainers
Kim Ji-ho (born 1974), South Korean actress
Oh Ji-ho (born 1976), South Korean actor
Choi Ji-ho (born 1980), South Korean actor
Shim Ji-ho (born 1981), South Korean actor
Song Ji-ho (born 1992), South Korean actor 
Woo Ji-ho (born 1992), stage name Zico, South Korean rapper, leader of boy group Block B

Sportspeople
Park Ji-ho (born 1970), South Korean football defender (K-League Classic)
Cha Ji-ho (born 1983), South Korean football midfielder (K-League Classic)
Ahn Ji-Ho (born 1987), South Korean football defender (K-League Challenge)
Han Ji-ho (born 1988), South Korean football forward (K-League Challenge)
Park Ji-ho (diver) (born 1991), South Korean diver

Other
Shin Ji-ho (born 1963), South Korean politician
Jieho Lee (born 1973), American filmmaker of Korean descent
Jiho Lee (born 1985), South Korean-born American model
Chi-Ho Han (born 1992), South Korean pianist in Europe

See also
List of Korean given names

References

Korean unisex given names